Kostroma is a city in Russia.

Kostroma may also refer to:
Kostroma (deity), a Slavic goddess
Kostroma (cattle), a Russian cattle breed
Kostroma (horse), a thoroughbred racehorse
Kostroma Oblast, a federal subject of Russia
Kostroma (river), a river in Kostroma and Yaroslavl Oblasts, Russia
Kostroma (inhabited locality), a list of inhabited localities in Russia
Kostroma Airport, an airport in Kostroma, Russia
Russian submarine Kostroma (B-276), a Sierra-class submarine

See also
Kostromskoy (disambiguation)